The "Princeton Cannon Song" is a fight song that was written by Joseph Frederick Hewitt and Arthur Herbert Osborn, both members of the Princeton University Class of 1907. Hewitt and Osborn dedicated the song to their class.

References

Ivy League fight songs
American college songs
Princeton Tigers